CeX Ltd. (Complete Entertainment eXchange) is a British second hand retail store specialising in technology, computing, video games, DVDs and technology repair. It also sells new items. It was established in 1992 in London, and has since grown to have more than 380 shops in the UK which is a mix of franchise and centrally owned stores, and over 230 abroad.

History

CeX was started by Paul Farrington, Robert Dudani, Hugh Man, Charlie Brooker, Oli Smith and Oliver Ball. The first shop opened on London's Whitfield Street, close to Tottenham Court Road in 1992. The "CeX" name has moved away from "Computer eXchange" into an acronym for "Complete Entertainment eXchange", and company letterheads state "CeX LTD is trading as CeX Entertainment Exchange". The pronunciation of the chain's acronym name was confirmed as "sex" in British TV commercials aired in March 2017.

Dudani appeared on the British Channel 4 TV show The Secret Millionaire. This was after the business was affected by the 2011 England riots.

CeX Trading
CeX is a privately owned company. In 2005, CeX began issuing licences for franchising.

As a second hand retailer, CeX trades with customers offering either cash or a voucher for redemption in any CeX shop. CeX offer a 24-month warranty subject to terms on all of the second hand products the company sells. CeX no longer accept Bitcoin as payment.

In November 2017, CeX launched a technology repair service called CeX Clinic in the UK.  The service covers the repair of video game consoles, smartphones, tablets and laptops. Cex offer a 2 year warranty on device repairs and a no fix, no fee promise to customers.

As of December 2013, CeX Group under Dominic Durante now runs Designer Exchange buying luxury leather goods, jewellery and handbags, with stores in Kensington, Chelsea, Knightsbridge, Manchester, Birmingham, Leeds and Madrid.

Number of shops

References

External links
CeX Official website
CeXClinic Official website
CeX Official app
 

1992 establishments in the United Kingdom
Retail companies of the United Kingdom
Video game retailers in the United Kingdom
Companies based in Watford
Retail companies established in 1992